Intwari Stadium is a multi-purpose stadium in Bujumbura, Burundi.  It is currently used mostly for football matches.  The stadium holds 10,000.  It was formerly named after former Burundian prime minister and independence hero, Louis Rwagasore before being renamed on 1 July 2019.

References

External links
 Cafe.daum.net/stade – Stadium Pictures
StadiumDB.com pictures

Football venues in Burundi
Burundi
Athletics (track and field) venues in Burundi
Buildings and structures in Bujumbura
Multi-purpose stadiums